Eleanor Widener Dixon (18911966) was an American socialite and philanthropist. She was the daughter of George Dunton Widener and Eleanor Elkins Widener, and the younger sister of George Dunton Widener Jr. and Harry Elkins Widener.

She married Fitz Eugene Dixon in 1912, and they were divorced in 1936. They had a daughter, also named Eleanor Widener Dixon, and a son named Fitz Eugene Dixon Jr.

References

1891 births
1966 deaths
Widener family